The men's coxed pair competition at the 1952 Summer Olympics took place at Meilahti, Finland. It was held from 20 to 23 July. There were 15 boats (45 competitors) from 15 nations, with each nation limited to a single boat in the event. The event was won by French team Raymond Salles, Gaston Mercier, and coxswain Bernard Malivoire; it was the nation's first victory in the event (though a French boy had been the cox for a mixed team that won gold in 1900). Germany, which had won the event in 1936 but had been excluded from the 1948 Games after World War II, took silver (Heinz Manchen, Helmut Heinhold, and cox Helmut Noll). Sweden, the defending champions, had an all-new crew of Svend Ove Pedersen, Poul Svendsen, and cox Jørgen Frantzen; they took bronze.

Background

This was the eighth appearance of the event. Rowing had been on the programme in 1896 but was cancelled due to bad weather. The men's coxed pair was one of the original four events in 1900, but was not held in 1904, 1908, or 1912. It returned to the programme after World War I and was held every Games from 1924 to 1992, when it (along with the men's coxed four) was replaced with the men's lightweight double sculls and men's lightweight coxless four.

Three of the 28 competitors from the 1948 coxed pair event returned: one of the rowers from Italy's silver medal team, Aldo Tarlao, and the coxswains from Hungary (bronze medal winning Róbert Zimonyi) and Greece (ninth-place finisher Grigorios Emmanouil). Favorite status went to the winners of the last three European championships, the Italian team of Tarlao, Giuseppe Ramani, and Luciano Marion. Switzerland's Walter Lüchinger, Alex Siebenhaar, and Walter Ludin had been the runner-up the last two European events.

Egypt, Finland, the Soviet Union, and Sweden each made their debut in the event. France made its eighth appearance, the only nation to have competed in all editions of the event to that point.

Competition format

The coxed pair event featured three-person boats, with two rowers and a coxswain. It was a sweep rowing event, with the rowers each having one oar (and thus each rowing on one side). The course returned to the 2000 metres distance that became the Olympic standard in 1912 (with the exception of 1948).

The competition expanded from previous years to include a second repechage after the semifinals. This brought the tournament to five rounds total: quarterfinals, semifinals, and a final with two repechages after the first two rounds.

 Quarterfinals: There were 4 quarterfinals, with 3 or 4 boats each. Two boats from each heat (8 boats total) advanced to the semifinals; all other boats (7 boats total) went to the first repechage.
 First repechage: There were 2 repechage heats, with 3 or 4 boats each. The winner of each heat (2 boats) went to the second repechage (not the semifinals); all other boats (5 total) were eliminated.
 Semifinals: There were 2 semifinals, each with 4 boats. The winner of each heat (2 boats) advanced directly to the final; the remaining boats (6 total) went to the second repechage.
 Second repechage: There were 3 heats, with 2 or 3 boats each. The winner of each heat (3 boats) advanced to the final, with the rest of the boats (5 total) eliminated.
 Final: A single final, with 5 boats.

Schedule

All times are Eastern European Summer Time (UTC+3)

Results

The following rowers took part:

Quarterfinals

Quarterfinal 1

Quarterfinal 2

Quarterfinal 3

Quarterfinal 4

First repechage

First repechage heat 1

First repechage heat 2

Semifinals

Semifinal 1

Semifinal 2

Second repechage

Second repechage heat 1

Second repechage heat 2

Second repechage heat 3

Final

Results summary

References

External links

Rowing at the 1952 Summer Olympics